Patrimonio is a Filipino surname that may refer to the following people:
Alvin Patrimonio (born 1966), Filipino basketball player 
Anna Clarice Patrimonio (born 1993), Filipino tennis player
Tin Patrimonio (born 1991), Filipino tennis player, model, actress and reality show contestant